Sychevka is a rural locality (a selo) and the administrative center of Sychyovsky Selsoviet, Smolensky District, Altai Krai, Russia. The population was 2,142 as of 2013. There are 28 streets.

Geography 
Sychevka is located on the Peschanaya River, 47 km southwest of Smolenskoye (the district's administrative centre) by road. Novotyryshkino is the nearest rural locality.

References 

Rural localities in Smolensky District, Altai Krai